Curtis Bay may refer to some places in Maryland in the United States:

 Curtis Bay, Maryland (body of water), a covered by Curtis Creek in Baltimore
 Curtis Bay, Baltimore, a neighborhood in Baltimore
 Curtis Bay Depot, a Defense National Stockpile Center in Curtis Bay
 Curtis Bay Coast Guard Yard
 Route 64 (MTA Maryland) or "Curtis Bay Line", a Maryland Transit Administration bus route